Moropeche is a village in the province of Albacete, Castile-La Mancha, Spain. 

Populated places in the Province of Albacete